Ghost in Love (aka Suicide Ghost Club) is a 1999 South Korean film written by Li Hong-zhou and directed by Lee Kwang-hoon. The film stars Kim Hee-sun in the title role as the girlfriend of a man she suspects of cheating on her. She throws herself underneath an oncoming train (with some help from nearby ghosts), and discovers that in the afterlife she can roam as a ghost and take revenge, if she wants to, on her former boyfriend, who has quickly moved on. Lee Sung-jae also stars as Kantorates, a ghost who befriends the protagonist. The film was released on August 14, 1999.

Cast
Kim Hee-sun as Jin Chae-byul
Lee Sung-jae as Kantorates
Cha Seung-won as Na Han-su
Yu Hye-jeong as Baek
Jang Jin-young as Lee Young-eun
Lee Yeong-ja as Deity
Myeong Gye-nam as Sales manager (1)
Park Kwang-jeong as Sales manager (2)
Jeong Won-jung as Messenger of Death (1)
Jang Se-jin as Messenger of Death (2)
Kim Si-won as Hyun-ju
Jae Hee as Chae-byul's younger brother
Kim Myeong-su

External links

1990s ghost films
South Korean horror films
1990s romantic fantasy films
Films about suicide
South Korean ghost films
1990s Korean-language films